Mohamed Salah Balti (born April 10, 1980) is a Tunisian singer, rapper, composer and music producer.

Biography 

He began his artistic career with the group Wled Bled before starting, in 2002, to make himself known on the Tunisian scene through an unofficial album with DJ Danjer.

In 2003, he collaborated with the Tunisian director Mohamed Zrane in the soundtrack of his film "The Prince" where he had written, composed and performed three pieces in addition to the end credits of the film.

From 2004 to 2009, he gave concerts throughout Tunisia but also in Europe where he performed notably with Rohff, Tandem, FactorX, Sinik, Cheb Slim, Diam's, and in Germany with Methodman and Redman.

In 2008, he formed his group X tension with which he released his first official album "Our World in Real". These two concerts are organized by Radio Libre de Tunisie.

In 2017, he released a single called "Ya Lili". It is a duet with Hammouda, a little Tunisian boy unknown at the time of the general public. The clip posted on YouTube has a record number of views ever recorded in Tunisia and the Arab world, and made Balti more well-known in the region.

Discography

Songs
2005: "Harka" (with Mastaziano)
2008: "Mamma"
2008: "Alamat Essaa"
2009: "Chneya dhanbi"
2010: "Passe partout"
2010: "Layem"
2011: "Mouwaten Karim"
2011: "Ici ou là-bas" (with Mister You)
2011: "Akadhib"
2011: "Jey mel rif lel assima"
2012: "Stop violence" (directed by Malek Ben Gaied Hassine)
2012: "Yatim" (directed by Borhen Ben Hassouna)
2012: "Meskina"
2012: "Témoin suicide" (directed by Malek Ben Gaied Hassine)
2014: "Kill Somebody" (directed by Malek Ben Gaied Hassine)
2014: "Douza Douza" (with Zied Nigro)
2015: "Chafouni Zawali" (with Akram Mag)
2015: "Stagoutay"
2015: "Sahara"
2015: "Galouli Matji" (with Zina El Gasrinia)
2015: "Mama j'suis là" (with DJ Meyz & Tunisiano)
2015: "Skerti Rawhi"
2015: "Houma Theb Etoub"
2016: "Hala Mala"
2016: "Erakh lé" (with Mister You)
2016: "Désolé" (with Walid Tounssi)
2016: "Harba"
2016: "Clandestino" (with Master Sina)
2017: "Wala Lela"
2017: "Maztoula"
2017: "Khaliha ala rabi"
2017: "Law Le3ebti Ya Zahr" (with Zaza)
2017: "Ya Lili" (with Hamouda)
2018: "Khalini Nrou9"
2019: "Maghrébins" (with Mister You)
2019: "Bouhali"
2019: "Denia" (with Hamouda)
2019: "Haha"
2019: "Filamen"
2020: "Valise"
2020: "Oulala"
2020: "Mawal"
2021: "Ya Hasra"
2021: "7elma"
2021: "Ena"
2022: "Ghareeb Alay" (with Elyanna)
2022: "Allo"
2022: "Amirti"

References 

1980 births
21st-century Tunisian male singers
Living people